The 2010–11 football season in Belgium, which is the 108th season of competitive football in the country and runs from August 2010 until July 2011.

National team

UEFA Euro 2012 qualification

Friendlies

Promotion and relegation
Team promoted to 2010–11 Belgian First Division
 Belgian Second Division Champions: Lierse

Teams relegated from 2009–10 Belgian First Division
 15th Place: Roeselare (lost playoff)
 16th Place: Mouscron (Mouscron was declared bankrupt during the season and relegated to third division.)

Teams promoted to 2010-11 Belgian Second Division
 Belgian Third Division A Champions: Heist
 Belgian Third Division B Champions: Visé
 Playoff winners: Rupel Boom

Teams relegated from 2009-10 Belgian Second Division
 19th Place: RFC Liège
 Playoff losers: Ronse
 Did not obtain a license: Beveren

Teams promoted to 2010-11 Belgian Third Division
 Belgian Promotion A Champions: Izegem
 Belgian Promotion B Champions: Bornem
 Belgian Promotion C Champions: Geel
 Belgian Promotion D Champions: Bertrix
 Playoff winners: Olsa Brakel
 Playoff winners: Heppignies
 Playoff winners: Grimbergen
 Playoff winners: Huy

Teams relegated from 2009-10 Belgian Third Division
 17th Place in Third Division A: Ieper
 18th Place in Third Division A: Racing Mechelen
 19th Place in Third Division A: Willebroek-Meerhof
 17th Place in Third Division B: Veldwezelt
 18th Place in Third Division B: Péruwelz
 Playoff losers: Zottegem
 Playoff losers: Tongeren

League competitions

Belgian First Division

Belgian Second Division

Belgian Second Division Final Round

Belgian Third Division

Belgian Third Division A

Belgian Third Division B

Third division play-off
From the third division A, Deinze qualified as winner of the periods 2 (matches 11 to 22) and 3 (matches 23 to 34), Hoogstraten and Coxyde qualified as 2nd and 4th placed teams in the final table. The first period (matches 1 to 10) was won by the champion Aalst. However, as only the champion Aalst, as well as Hoogstraten, Sint-Niklaas and Geel-Meerhout had got their remunerated football license, required to be able to enter the play-offs, Coxyde and Deinze did not enter the play-offs.

From the third division B, Virton qualified as the winner of period 1, Bertrix qualified as the 3rd-placed team in the final table and Zaventem as the 4th-placed team. The champion Woluwe had won periods 2 and 3. However, Bertrix did not apply for the remunerated football license and was replaced for the play-offs by Union, the 5th-placed team in the final table.

From the second division, Turnhout qualified for the second round of the play-off as the 16th-placed team.

Belgian Promotion
In the Promotion A, Athois were crowned champions, while Ieper, Péruwelz-Mouscron and Sparta Petegem respectively won the first period (matches 1 to 10), second period (matches 11 to 20) and third period (matches 21 to 30). In the Promotion B, RC Mechelen won the regular season as well as the second period. Lyra and Londerzeel won respectively the first and third periods. Wijgmaal also entered the Promotion play-off as 3rd-placed team in the final table. In the Promotion C, Maasmechelen won the title, as well as the first and third periods and Tielen won the second period. Veldwezelt and Oosterwijk also qualified for the play-off as  respectively the 2nd and 3rd-placed teams in the regular season. In the Promotion D, La Calamine won the championship as well as periods 1 and 3 and Walhain won the period 2. Sprimont-Comblain and Faymonville joined Walhain as qualifier for the play-off from group D as respectively 3rd and 4th-placed teams. The two 16th-placed teams from the third division Cappellen and Ternat also qualified for the Promotion play-off, entering the competition in the second round.

European Club results
Note that the Belgian team's score is always given first.

 Anderlecht and Gent started the season in the qualifying rounds of the Champions League, respectively in the champions and non-champions path. Both were eliminated and dropped into the Europa League. Anderlecht suffered a major mental blow after losing out on penalties to Partizan Belgrade, whereas Gent was no match for Dynamo Kyiv. In the Europa League, Gent performed above expectations as they first knocked out Feyenoord and then came close to progress through the group stage, only losing to French league leaders Lille on the final day, earlier defeating Levski Sofia from Bulgaria and Portuguese club Sporting CP at home. After some mediocre results in the group stage, Anderlecht only scraped through on the last day as they beat Hajduk Split and Zenit St. Petersburg also won their match against AEK Athens. In the knockout round, Anderlecht was blown away 0-3 and 0-2 by Ajax, although their victory of the season before had given them high hopes before the match.
 Cercle Brugge, Genk and Club Brugge started respectively in the second qualifying round, third qualifying round and playoff round of the Europa League. Cercle Brugge beat Finnish team TPS Turku before narrowly losing out to Anorthosis Famagusta of Cyprus. Genk also beat a team from Turku, namely Inter Turku, after losing out to Porto. Club Brugge did reach the group stage by beating Dinamo Minsk, but then scored only three points in six matches after a very disappointing string of results against Villarreal, PAOK and Dinamo Zagreb.

Other honours

European qualification for 2011-12 summary

See also
 2010–11 Belgian First Division
 2010–11 Belgian Cup
 2011 Belgian Super Cup
 Belgian Second Division
 Belgian Third Division: divisions A and B
 Belgian Promotion: divisions A, B, C and D

References

 
Belgian
Seasons in Belgian football